Rachel Elise Barkow (née Selinfreund; born 1971) is an American professor of law at the New York University School of Law. She is also faculty director of the Center on the Administration of Criminal Law.  Her scholarship focuses on administrative and criminal law, and she is especially interested in applying the lessons and theory of administrative law to the administration of criminal justice.  In 2007, Barkow won the Podell Distinguished Teaching Award at NYU.  In the fall of 2008, she served as the Beneficial Visiting Professor of Law at Harvard Law School.

Education and clerkships

In 1993, Barkow graduated from Northwestern University with a Bachelor of Arts in history and psychology and was inducted as a member of Phi Beta Kappa. In 1996, she graduated magna cum laude from Harvard Law School. At Harvard, Barkow won the Sears Prize (awarded to the top two grade point averages in the first year of law school), and served on the Harvard Law Review.

She clerked for Judge Laurence H. Silberman at the U.S. Court of Appeals for the District of Columbia Circuit, and for Justice Antonin Scalia at the U.S. Supreme Court, according to one report serving as the "counter-clerk"—the nickname given to the Democrat he hires to sniff out political biases in his arguments.

Legal career

Barkow was an associate at Kellogg, Huber, Hansen, Todd & Evans in Washington, D.C., from 1998–2002, where she focused on telecommunications and administrative law issues in proceedings before the FCC, state regulatory agencies, and federal and state courts. She took a leave from the firm in 2001 to serve as the John M. Olin Fellow in Law at Georgetown University Law Center.

She has published more than 40 articles, essays, and book chapters, and her work has appeared in the country's top law reviews. She has contributed editorials to publications such as the New York Times, Washington Post,Huffington Post, and the Boston Herald.

Public service

She was a member of the Manhattan District Attorney's Office's Conviction Integrity Policy Advisory Panel from 2010-2021.  She has testified before the United States House of Representatives Subcommittee Crime, Terrorism, and Homeland Security on Clemency,; before the Subcommittee on Commerce, Trade, and Consumer Protection regarding the proposed Consumer Financial Protection Agency,;before the Subcommittee on the Constitution, Civil Rights, and Civil Liberties,; and before the United States Senate Judiciary Committee regarding the future of the federal sentencing guidelines in the wake of the Supreme Court's decision in Blakely v. Washington''.

On April 15, 2013, President Obama nominated Barkow to serve as a Commissioner on the U.S. Sentencing Commission. According to her NYU Law biography, Barkow served as a Commissioner on the U.S. Sentencing Commission from June of 2013 until January of 2019, although the U.S. Sentencing Commission website says that she ended her appointment in 2018.

Honors and awards
She was elected to the American Academy of Arts and Sciences in 2019.

Selected publications

See also 
 List of law clerks of the Supreme Court of the United States (Seat 9)

References

External links
Profile at New York University

1971 births
Living people
American women academics
Harvard Law School alumni
Law clerks of the Supreme Court of the United States
Members of the United States Sentencing Commission
New York University faculty
New York University School of Law faculty
Northwestern University alumni
American women legal scholars
American legal scholars
21st-century American women